Round Lake is a natural lake in Deuel County, South Dakota, in the United States.

Round Lake received its name on account of its round outline.

See also
List of lakes in South Dakota

References

Lakes of South Dakota
Lakes of Deuel County, South Dakota